P63 may refer to:

Vessels 
 , a submarine of the Royal Navy
 , a corvette of the Indian Navy
 , an offshore patrol vessel of the Irish Naval Service

Other uses 
 Bell P-63 Kingcobra, an American fighter aircraft
 BMW P63, an automobile engine
 Papyrus 63, a biblical manuscript
 TP63, tumor protein p63
 P63, a state regional road in Latvia